The Americas Zone was one of the three regional zones of the 1973 Davis Cup.

12 teams entered the Americas Zone split across two sub-zones, the North & Central America Zone and the South America Zone. 5 teams played in each of the sub-zone's preliminary rounds, with two teams progressing to each sub-zone's main draw to join the previous year's finalists the United States and Chile. The winners of each sub-zone main draw then played against each other to determine who moved to the Inter-Zonal Zone to compete against the winners of the Eastern Zone and Europe Zone.

The United States defeated Mexico in the North & Central America Zone final, and Chile defeated Argentina in the South America Zone final. In the Americas Inter-Zonal Final, the United States defeated Chile and progressed to the Inter-Zonal Zone.

North & Central America Zone

Preliminary rounds

Draw

First round
Colombia vs. Canada

Qualifying round
Colombia vs. Caribbean/West Indies

Mexico vs. Venezuela

Main Draw

Draw

Semifinals
Mexico vs. Colombia

Final
Mexico vs. United States

South America Zone

Preliminary rounds

Draw

First round
Argentina vs. Ecuador

Qualifying round
Argentina vs. Brazil

Uruguay vs. South Africa

Main Draw

Draw

Semifinals
Argentina vs. South Africa

Final
Argentina vs. Chile

Americas Inter-Zonal Final
United States vs. Chile

The doubles match between Smith/van Dillen and Cornejo/Fillol set the Davis Cup record for the most games in a doubles rubber (122). The second set, which went to 37-39, set the record for the most games played in a set (76).

References

External links
Davis Cup official website

Davis Cup Americas Zone
America Zone
Davis Cup
Davis Cup
Davis Cup
Davis Cup
Davis Cup
Davis Cup